Plumbagin or 5-hydroxy-2-methyl-1,4-naphthoquinone is an organic compound with the chemical formula . It is regarded as a toxin and it is genotoxic and mutagenic.

Plumbagin is a yellow dye, formally derived from naphthoquinone.

It is named after the plant genus Plumbago, from which it was originally isolated.
It is also commonly found in the carnivorous plant genera Drosera and Nepenthes. It is also a component of the black walnut drupe.

See also 
 Juglone

References 

1,4-Naphthoquinones
Hydroxynaphthoquinones